The canon of work by Ibn Hazm, prolific and important Andalusian jurist, belletrist, and heresiographer is extensive.  He was said to have written over 400 books.

Works

Al-Dhahabi's account
Al-Dhahabi gives the following list of ibn Hazm's work:

Other accounts
Other works have been attributed to Ibn Hazm as well. Abu Abd al-Rahman Ibn Aqil al-Zahiri, the primary biographer of Ibn Hazm in the modern era, attributed to Ibn Hazm an epistle in exegesis of the 94th verse of the chapter of Yunus in the Qur'an as well as an exposition of different world religions, though Ihsan Abbas mentions that the reference to these works is hard to find. Ibn Aqil has two large works covering both the influence of Ibn Hazm's common works and cataloging his rarities, Ibn Hazm khilal alfa 'aam and Nawadir al-imam Ibn Hazm respectively.

Notes

References 
 
 Polemics (Muslim-Jewish), Camilla Adang, Sabine Schmidtke: Andalusi Ibn Ḥazm, who was known for his rather indiscriminate vilification of opponents, even if they were Muslims., p. 6, in "Encyclopedia of Jews in the Islamic World", ed. Norman Stillman 

Bibliographies by writer
 
Bibliographies of Spanish writers
Philosophy bibliographies
Religious bibliographies